Maogang was a district of Maoming, Guangdong province, China. In 2014 it was merged with Dianbai County to form the new Dianbai District.

County-level divisions of Guangdong
Maoming
States and territories disestablished in 2014
2014 disestablishments in China
States and territories established in 2001
2001 establishments in China
Former districts of China
History of Guangdong